Muhammad Haimie bin Abdullah Nyaring, formerly known as Haimie Anak Nyaring (born 31 May 1998) is a Bruneian professional footballer of Iban descent who plays as a goalkeeper for DPMM FC and the Brunei national team.

Club career

Haimie was initially a defender in his youth years, even managing to represent Brunei in an under-15 tournament held in Malaysia in June 2013 while playing in that position. He converted into a goalkeeper by the time he was brought in by Panchor Murai FC debuting in the Brunei Premier League in 2015. The following season, Haimie was placed by NFABD to play for Tabuan U21, the league team of the national under-21 side in the Super League. He was largely an understudy to Ishyra Asmin Jabidi in his time there.

Haimie returned to Panchor Murai FC in the first half of 2017, unfortunately his side finished last in the Premier League with only five points from a possible 24. His performances for the national under-23s instigated a move to Indera SC for the second half of the 2017 Super League season, and found regular playing time there. At the end of the season, he became the league's Best Player by helping Indera to third place, despite only at the club halfway through.

In February 2018, Haimie joined Brunei's professional side DPMM FC after impressing new head coach Renê Weber at a pre-season trial. He made his league debut against Home United on 7 April in a 4–2 win, unfortunately scoring an own goal in the 75th minute. On 3 June, he was sent off for violent conduct on Taku Morinaga in the 74th minute during the 5-0 loss against Albirex Niigata (S).

Haimie lost his place in the 2019 season after a rejuvenated Wardun Yussof became the captain and undisputed starter for Adrian Pennock. Haimie made his only league appearance on 18 July against Hougang United in a 3–1 loss after Wardun suffered an injury in the warm-up before the game. He also appeared in two Singapore Cup games, including the third-place match against Geylang International on 2 November when after the sides went to penalties after a 2–2 score, Haimie was able to score his spot-kick after all 20 outfield players' attempts have been successful. Immediately after, Andrei Varankow had his penalty saved by Zainol Gulam to leave DPMM in fourth place.

Haimie left DPMM at the start of 2020 to start a career with the Royal Brunei Police Force. He rejoined the side in June the following year before the 2021 Brunei Super League commenced.

Haimie became the starting goalkeeper for DPMM at the 2022 Brunei FA Cup, winning the trophy after a 2–1 victory over Kasuka FC in the final on 4 December.

International career
As part of Tabuan U21, Haimie was invited to train with the full national team for a regional tournament in Sabah, Malaysia in January 2016. The following October, he joined up with the squad yet again for two friendly matches against the Malaysian national under-22 squad. He was not selected for the 2016 AFF Championship qualification matches, nor the 2016 AFC Solidarity Cup; Ishyra Asmin Jabidi was chosen instead.

Haimie's luck made an upturn in 2017 when he was selected to play ahead of Ishyra for the first match of the 2018 AFC U-23 Championship qualification held in Myanmar in July for the Brunei under-23s, against regional giants Australia. He performed admirably, keeping out the Olyroos' 10 chances in the first half alone, before a 53rd-minute penalty by George Blackwood and a Riley McGree strike in the last five minutes sank the Young Wasps to a 2–0 defeat. He drew praise from opposition coach Josep Gombau and subsequently kept his place for the remainder of the tournament.

The following month, the Under-23s competed in the 29th SEA Games held in Kuala Lumpur, Malaysia. Haimie started the opening game of the tournament against the hosts and once again kept the scoreline to a minimum, only conceding twice to the Young Tigers. Two defeats to Myanmar and Laos followed where he let in nine unanswered goals. He was benched for Ishyra in the last deadwood game against Singapore.

In December 2017, Haimie was recalled to the national team for the 2017 Aceh World Solidarity Tsunami Cup and played in the 4–0 loss against Indonesia. The next year, he was selected for the 2018 AFF Suzuki Cup qualification matches against Timor-Leste in early September. He gained his first full national team cap on 1 September in the first leg at Kuala Lumpur in a 3–1 loss. He kept a clean sheet in the second leg at home, but the Wasps failed to progress to the tournament proper with only a 1–0 win at Hassanal Bolkiah National Stadium on 8 September.

Haimie played for Brunei U23 at the 2020 AFC U-23 Championship qualification games held in Vietnam, starting against Thailand in the second match on 24 March. He scored an own goal for the final Thai goal of the night in a 0–8 loss. He was also a starter in the following game against Indonesia which finished in a 2–1 defeat for the Young Wasps.

Despite losing his place to Wardun Yussof as the starting goalkeeper for DPMM in the 2019 season, he was the national team starting goalkeeper against Mongolia for the 2022 World Cup qualification matches in June of that year. The Wasps failed to progress to Round 2, losing 2–3 on aggregate.

Haimie was selected for the 30th Southeast Asian Games football tournament held in the Philippines on November-December 2019. He played in three out of five matches, including the third game against Laos when he had to be subbed in due to the dismissal of Ishyra Asmin Jabidi.

In 2022, Haimie played in three out of four friendly matches for the national team in preparation for the 2022 AFF Championship qualification, keeping a cleen sheet in the home fixture against Laos on 27 September which ended 1–0 to the Wasps. He started in both legs of the qualifying games against Timor-Leste which was held in Brunei in early November. The Wasps managed to qualify for the tournament proper by a 6–3 win on aggregate. At the regional tournament, Haimie played in all four games and despite conceding 22 goals performed brilliantly throughout, such that head coach Mario Rivera designated him as the captain in the matches against the Philippines and Cambodia.

Honours
DPMM FC
Singapore Premier League: 2019
 Brunei FA Cup: 2022

References

External links

1998 births
Living people
Iban people
Converts to Islam
Association football goalkeepers
Bruneian footballers
Brunei international footballers
DPMM FC players
Indera SC players
Bruneian police officers
Competitors at the 2019 Southeast Asian Games
Southeast Asian Games competitors for Brunei